The Maritime Union of New Zealand is a trade union which represents waterfront workers, seafarers and related workers in New Zealand. It was formed in 2002 from the merger of the New Zealand Waterfront Workers' Union and the New Zealand Seafarers' Union.

The MUNZ is affiliated with the New Zealand Council of Trade Unions, the New Zealand Labour Party and the International Transport Workers' Federation.

References

External links
 MUNZ official site.

New Zealand Council of Trade Unions
International Transport Workers' Federation
Maritime trade unions
Trade unions established in 2002